José António da Costa Pereira Dias (born 4 January 1973), commonly known as Zezito, was a Portuguese futsal player who played as a pivot for Alhões, Atlético CP, Sporting CP, and SL Olivais in the Liga Portuguesa de Futsal, and for Ourense in the Spanish Liga Nacional de Fútbol Sala. Zezito was also frequently called to the Portugal national team, earning 68 caps in total.

References

External links

1973 births
Living people
Portuguese men's futsal players
Sporting CP futsal players